Misha Gabriel (born May 13, 1987), also known as Misha Gabriel Hamilton, is an American dancer, choreographer, and actor. He is known for dancing mainly in the shows of Janet Jackson and Michael Jackson, and for his role as Eddy in Step Up Revolution (2012) and Step Up: All In (2014).

Life and career
Gabriel was born in Fort Lauderdale, Florida. His mother, Irina Brecher, is a ballet dancer from Romania. Gabriel, who was raised in Larkspur, Colorado, began dancing at the early age of two years. He appeared with Janet Jackson for three years in a number of her videos, TV shows, and live performances. He also took part in shows by Mariah Carey, Beyoncé, Christina Aguilera, Chris Brown, Ne-Yo, The Pussycat Dolls, Hilary Duff, John Legend, Kylie Minogue, and Omarion.

He has worked in several American commercials and in the movies Jackass Number Two, Clerks 2, and Center Stage: Turn It Up.

Gabriel was selected as a principal dancer for Michael Jackson's This Is It concerts and was set to perform in all 50 shows scheduled for the O2 Arena in London, England. The concerts were canceled 18 days before the dancers were set to travel to London due to Michael Jackson's death. Gabriel was subsequently featured along with the 10 other dancers in the concerts' behind the scenes film, Michael Jackson's This Is It.

He then appeared in a major role, as Eddie, Sean (Ryan Guzman's) best friend, in the film Step Up Revolution (2012), directed by Scott Speer and Step Up: All In (2014), directed by Trish Sie.

He choreographed in:
 Justin Timberlake's live show FutureSex/LoveShow as a choreographer (2007) 
Music video for BoA's single "Eat You Up" in 2008
In 2009, he was part of a planned This Is It series of 50 concerts by Michael Jackson to be held at The O2 Arena in London that was canceled because of Jackson's sudden death three weeks before the show's inaugural event. He was part of the backup dancers on Michael Jackson's This Is It
 The Pussycat Dolls' Doll Domination Tour
 The Cheetah Girls One World Tour
Sara Lee/High School Musical 3 commercial
 Raven-Symoné's "Supernatural" and Dancing With the Stars
 Justin Bieber's Never Say Never Tour
 SHINee's amigo

Personal life
Misha is good friends with actor Kenny Wormald. They grew up dancing together and have worked together as dancers and actors. Misha is also good friends with choreographer Travis Wall.

Filmography

Film
2006: Clerks II (credited as  )
2008: Center Stage: Turn It Up - as a Detroit dancer
2009: Michael Jackson's This Is It - as himself
2012: Step Up Revolution - as Eddy 
2012: Boogie Town - as Matthew (post-production)
2014: Step Up: All In - as Eddy

Television
2015: It's Showtime - as himself (guest performer) on May 29, 2015 episode

References

External links
 

1987 births
American male dancers
American male film actors
American people of Romanian descent
Living people
Male actors from Fort Lauderdale, Florida
21st-century American male actors